The Union Dutchwomen's ice hockey team represents Union College in Schenectady, New York, United States.

History
From 1999 to 2003, the Dutchwomen competed in Division III hockey. In 2003, the Dutchwomen joined the ECAC.

On February 20, 2010, senior Jackie Koetteritz, had played in her 125th game for the Dutchwomen, setting a record for the most games in a Dutchwoman uniform.

On November 4, 2011: Emilie Arseneault scored a short handed goal late into the second period to give the Dutchwomen a 2-1 conference victory over the Clarkson Golden Knights women's ice hockey program. It was the Dutchwomen's first ECAC win since the 2009-2010 season, and only their second ECAC win since 2004.

Despite ending the 2013-14 season with a 9-24-1 record, several milestones were achieved. Their nine wins, all recorded by goaltender Shenae Lundberg, setting a record for most wins in one season by a goaltender, signified the highest win total under Head Coach Claudia Asano Barcomb. Starting the season 2-0 for the first time in program history, the Dutchwomen enjoyed another notable first, defeating the Princeton Tigers. The Dutchwomen also set a new program record with 25 power play goals, as senior forward Stefanie Thomson scored seven power play goals, also a program record. Subsequently, their efforts on the power play resulted in the third best power play in the ECAC conference, ranking eighth best in the nation. As a side note, team captain Maddy Norton would lead the team in assists (18) and points (21). 

In 2019-2020, the Dutchwomen finished 9th in the ECAC, their highest finish in the league. They finished the season at 5-24-5 overall, and 5-13-5 in conference play.

Year by year

Team captains
2011-12 Dania Simmonds
2013-14: Ashley Johnston and Maddy Norton 
2014-2015: Christina Valente

Current roster
As of September 6, 2022.

Notable players
 Ashley Johnston
 A defensemen and captain for the New York Riveters in the NWHL. She is also a robotics engineer who has also won the Ashley Kilstein Community Service award as a member of the Union College women's ice hockey team.
 Dania Simmonds
 A defenseman and alternate captain for the Markham Thunder CWHL winner of the Adrienne Clarkson trophy.

Awards and honors
Jackie Koetteritz, 2008-09 All-ECAC Hockey Academic Selection
Emma Rambo, ECAC Rookie of the Week (Week of October 5, 2009)
2009 ECAC Turfer Athletic Trophy: Union Dutchwomen team
Grace Heiting, Finalist, 2021 ECAC Mandi Schwartz Student-Athlete of the Year Award

ECAC Weekly Awards
Bella McKee, ECAC Hockey Goaltender of the Week (Union) (awarded October 21, 2019)

Team Awards
George Morrison MVP Award
Shenae Lundberg, 2015 George Morrison MVP Award
Alli Devins, 2017 George Morrison Most Valuable Player award
Katelynn Russ, 2018 George Morrison Most Valuable Player award
Katelynn Russ, 2020 George Morrison Most Valuable Player award

Hana Yamasita Coaches Award'’
Dania Simmonds, 2012 Coaches Award
Christine Valente, 2015 Hana Yamashita Coaches Award 
Alli Devins, 2017 Hana Yamasita Coaches Award winner (given to the player that shows a supreme competitiveness, consistently gives 100 percent effort in both practice and games, and is extraordinarily conditioned with an unmatched work ethic)
Arianna Kosakowski, 2018 Hana Yamashita Coaches'Award
Megan Ryan, 2020 Hana Yamasita Coaches Award winnerMost Improved Player awardDania Simmonds, 2010 Most Improved Player
Elizabeth Otten, 2015 Most Improved Player
Eastyn Yuen, 2017 Most Improved Player award 
Alli First, 2018 Most Improved Player
Olivia Groulx, 2020 "Ancora Imparo" Process Award (formerly Most Improved Player award)Rookie of the YearErica Kelly, 2015 Rookie of the Year. 
Kate Spooner, 2017 Dutchwomen Rookie of the Year
Megan Ryan, 2018 Rookie of the YearUnsung Hero awardChristine Valente, 2013 Unsung Hero Award
Christine Valente, 2014 Unsung Hero Award
Christine Valente, 2015 Unsung Hero Award
Alli Devins, 2017 Unsung Hero award
Katie Laughlin, 2018 Unsung Hero AwardAshley Kilstein  '08 Community Service AwardDania Simmonds, 2012
Ashley Johnston 2013  
Ashley Johnston 2014  
Nicole Russell, 2015  
Caitlyn McLaren, 2017  
Amelia Murray, 2018  
Amelia Murray and Rachel de Perio, 2020  Garnet Glue Award''
Makayla Mori, 2020 Garnet Glue Award

Dutchwomen in professional hockey

See also
Union Dutchmen ice hockey

References

External links
Union Dutchwomen ice hockey

 
Ice hockey clubs established in 1999
Ice hockey teams in New York (state)
1999 establishments in New York (state)